The Anti-Money Laundering, Anti-Terrorism Financing and Proceeds of Unlawful Activities Act 2001 is a Malaysian counter-terrorism legislation. It is enacted to provide for the offence of money laundering, the measures to be taken for the prevention of money laundering and terrorism financing offences and to provide for the forfeiture of property involved in or derived from money laundering and terrorism financing offences, as well as terrorist property, proceeds of an unlawful activity and instrumentalities of an offence, and for matters incidental thereto and connected therewith.

Structure
The Anti-Money Laundering, Anti-Terrorism Financing and Proceeds of Unlawful Activities Act 2001, in its current form (1 December 2015), consists of 7 Parts containing 93 sections and 2 schedules (including 27 amendments).
 Part I: Preliminary
 Part II: Money Laundering Offences
 Part III: Financial Intelligence
 Part IV: Reporting Obligations
 Part IVA: Cross Border Movements of Cash and Bearer Negotiable Instruments
 Part V: Investigation
 Part VI: Freezing, Seizure and Forfeiture
 Part VIA: Suppression of Terrorism Financing Offences and Freezing, Seizure and Forfeiture of Terrorist Property
 Part VII: Miscellaneous
 Schedules

References

External links
 Anti-Money Laundering, Anti-Terrorism Financing and Proceeds of Unlawful Activities Act 2001 

2001 in Malaysian law
Malaysian federal legislation
Anti-money laundering measures
Counterterrorism